This article contains a list of current SNCF railway stations in the Nouvelle-Aquitaine region of France.

Charente (16)

 Angoulême
 Chabanais
 Chalais
 Chasseneuil-sur-Bonnieure
 Châteauneuf-sur-Charente
 Cognac
 Jarnac-Charente
 Luxé
 Montmoreau
 La Rochefoucauld
 Roumazières-Loubert
 Ruelle
 Ruffec

Charente-Maritime (17)

 Aigrefeuille-Le Thou
 Angoulins-sur-Mer
 Aytré-Plage
 Belliant
 Bords
 Brussac
 Châtelaillon
 La Jarrie
 Jonzac
 Loulay
 Montendre
 Pons
 Rochefort
 La Rochelle
 La Rochelle-Porte Dauphine
 Royan
 Saint-Aigulin-la-Roche-Chalais
 Saintes
 Saint-Hilaire-Brizambourg
 Saint-Jean-d'Angely
 Saint-Laurent-Fouras
 Saint-Savinien
 Saujon
 Surgères
 Tonnay-Charente
 Villeneuve-la-Comtesse

Corrèze (19)

 Allassac
 Aubazine-Saint-Hilaire
 Brive-la-Gaillarde
 Bugeat
 Le Burg
 Cornil
 Corrèze
 Égletons
 Jassonneix
 Lacelle
 Lubersac
 Masseret
 Meymac
 Montaignac-Saint-Hippolyte
 Objat
 Pérols
 Pompadour
 La Rivière-de-Mansac
 Saint-Aulaire
 Tulle
 Turenne
 Ussel
 Uzerche
 Varetz
 Vigeois
 Vignols-Saint-Solve

Creuse (23)

 Aubusson
 Busseau-sur-Creuse
 Felletin
 Guéret
 Lavaufranche
 Lavaveix-les-Mines
 Marsac (Creuse)
 Montaigut
 Parsac-Gouzon
 Saint-Sébastien
 La Souterraine
 Vieilleville

Deux-Sèvres (79)

 Beauvoir-sur-Niort
 Bressuire
 Cerizay
 La Crèche
 Fors
 Marigny
 Mauzé
 La Mothe-Saint-Héray
 Niort
 Pamproux
 Prin-Deyrançon
 Prissé-la-Charrière
 Saint-Maixent
 Thouars

Dordogne (24)

 Agonac
 Belvès
 Bergerac
 Le Bugue
 Le Buisson
 Château-l'Évêque
 Condat-Le Lardin
 La Coquille
 Couze
 Les Eyzies
 Gardonne
 Lalinde
 Lamonzie-Saint-Martin
 Lamothe-Montravel
 Mauzac
 Montpon-Ménestérol
 Mussidan
 Négrondes
 Neuvic (Dordogne)
 Niversac
 Périgueux
 Razac
 Saint-Antoine-de-Breuilh
 Saint-Astier
 Saint-Cyprien
 Saint-Léon-sur-l'Isle
 Saint-Pierre-de-Chignac
 Sarlat-la-Canéda
 Siorac-en-Périgord
 Terrasson
 Thenon
 Thiviers
 Trémolat
 Vélines
 Les Versannes
 Villefranche-du-Périgord

Gironde (33)

 Aloutte-France
 Arbanats
 Arcachon
 Aubie-Saint-Antoine
 Barsac
 Bassens
 Beautiran
 Bègles
 Blanquefort
 Bordeaux-Saint-Jean
 Bruges
 Cadaujac
 Castillon
 Caudéran-Mérignac
 Caudrot
 Cavignac
 Cenon
 Cérons
 Coutras
 Cubzac-les-Ponts
 Les Églisottes
 Facture-Biganos
 Gauriaguet
 Gazinet-Cestas
 Gironde
 La Gorp
 La Grave-d'Ambarès
 Gujan-Mestras
 La Hume
 Lamothe-Landerron
 Langon
 Lesparre
 Libourne
 Ludon
 Macau
 Marcheprime
 Margaux
 Mérignac-Arlac
 Moulis-Listrac
 Parempuyre
 Pauillac
 Pessac
 Podensac
 La Pointe-de-Grave
 Portets
 Preignac
 La Réole
 Saint-André-de-Cubzac
 Saint-Denis-de-Pile
 Sainte-Eulalie-Carbon-Blanc
 Sainte-Foy-la-Grande
 Saint-Émilion
 Saint-Loubès
 Saint-Macaire
 Saint-Mariens-Saint-Yzan
 Saint-Médard-de-Guizières
 Saint-Médard-d'Eyrans
 Saint-Pierre-d'Aurillac
 Saint-Seurin-sur-l'Isle
 Saint-Sulpice-Izon
 Soulac-sur-Mer
 Le Teich
 La Teste
 Vayres
 Le Verdon
 Villenave-d'Ornon

Haute-Vienne (87)

 L'Aiguille
 Aixe-sur-Vienne
 Ambazac
 Les Bardys
 Bellac
 Bersac
 Brignac
 Bussière-Galant
 Châteauneuf-Bujaleuf
 Coussac-Bonneval
 Le Dorat
 Eymoutiers-Vassivière
 Fromental
 La Jonchère
 Lafarge
 Limoges-Bénédictins
 Limoges-Montjovis
 Magnac-Vicq
 La Meyze
 Nantiat
 Nexon
 Nieul
 Peyrilhac-Saint-Jouvent
 Pierre-Buffière
 La Porcherie
 Saillat-Chassenon
 Saint-Brice-sur-Vienne
 Saint-Denis-des-Murs
 Saint-Germain-les-Belles
 Saint-Junien
 Saint-Léonard-de-Noblat
 Saint-Priest-Taurion
 Saint-Sulpice-Laurière
 Saint-Victurnien
 Saint-Yrieix-la-Perche
 Solignac-Le Vigen
 Vaulry
 Verneuil-sur-Vienne

Landes (40)

 Arengosse
 Bénesse-Maremne
 Dax
 Labenne
 Labouheyre
 Mont-de-Marsan
 Morcenx
 Ondres
 Peyrehorade
 Saint-Geours-de-Maremne
 Saint-Martin-d'Oney
 Saint-Vincent-de-Tyrosse
 Saubusse-les-Bains
 Ychoux
 Ygos

Lot-et-Garonne (47)

 Agen
 Aiguillon
 Laroque-Timbaut
 Marmande
 Monsempron-Libos
 Penne-d'Agenais
 Port-Sainte-Marie
 Sainte-Bazeille
 Sauveterre-la-Lémance
 Tonneins

Pyénées-Atlantiques (64)

 Artix
 Assat
 Bayonne
 Bedous
 Biarritz
 Bidarray-Pont-Noblia
 Bidos
 Boucau
 Buzy-en-Béarn
 Cambo-les-Bains
 Coarraze-Nay
 La Croix du Prince
 Les Deux-Jumeaux
 Gan
 Guéthary
 Halsou-Larressore
 Hendaye
 Lurbe-Saint-Christau
 Montaut-Bétharram
 Ogeu-les-Bains
 Oloron-Sainte-Marie
 Orthez
 Ossès-Saint-Martin-d'Arrossa
 Pau
 Puyoô
 Saint-Jean-de-Luz-Ciboure
 Saint-Jean-Pied-de-Port
 Sarrance
 Urt
 Ustaritz
 Villefranque

Vienne (86)

 Anché-Voulon
 Chasseneuil
 Châtellerault
 Dangé
 Dissay
 Épanvilliers
 Futuroscope
 Ingrandes-sur-Vienne
 Iteuil
 Jaunay-Clan
 Lathus
 Ligugé
 Lusignan
 Lussac-les-Châteaux
 Mignaloux-Nouaillé
 Montmorillon
 Naintré-les-Barres
 Nerpuy
 Les Ormes-sur-Vienne
 Poitiers
 Rouillé
 Saint-Saviol
 La Tricherie
 Vivonne

See also
 SNCF 
 List of SNCF stations for SNCF stations in other regions

Nouvelle-Aquitaine